Kutaisi Museum of Martial Art is a museum in Kutaisi, Georgia. The Kutaisi National Museum of Military Glory preserves materials reflecting the history of Georgian martial arts, weapons, materials dedicated to World War II, photos of Kutaisi soldiers, awards, correspondence and other documents, as well as documentary materials on the wars in Abkhazia and War of 2008 with Russia.

References 

Museums in Georgia (country)
Buildings and structures in Kutaisi
Military and war museums
Martial arts in Georgia (country)
Museums established in 1975